Mitchell Kennerley (August 14, 1878 – February 22, 1950) was an English born American publisher, editor, and gallery owner.

Life

He was born at Burslem, England.

He was the manager of the New York branch of John Lane, the London publisher, from 1896 to 1900, business manager of the Smart Set in 1900-01, founded in 1901 and was editor and proprietor until 1905 of the Reader magazine.

He married Helen Rockwell Morley. In 1906, he started in the book publishing business. He used typesetter Frederic W. Goudy for his books, and advanced him money to complete one of his first successful fonts, which Goudy named Kennerley Old Style as a dedication.

In 1910, he undertook the publication of The Forum and of The Papyrus (the later for author Michael Monahan). He was a dealer in and published the work of Oscar Wilde and Walt Whitman. In 1913, he was arrested, for sending an "obscene" book through the mail.

He was president of Anderson Galleries, from 1916 to 1929. In 1937-1938 he co-founded Parke-Bernet Galleries.

He died in New York City.

His papers are held at the New York Public Library, and Vassar College.

References

Bibliography
Bruccoli, Matthew J., The Fortunes of Mitchell Kennerley, Bookman; 1986, Harcourt, Brace Jovanovich

External links
 Shatzkin, Leonard, "Zero Royalty", book review of The Fortunes of Mitchell Kennerley, Bookman, by Matthew J. Bruccoli; The New York Times, December 7, 1986
 Gross, John, book review of The Fortunes of Mitchell Kennerley, Bookman, by Matthew J. Bruccoli; The New York Times, October 21, 1986

1878 births
1950 deaths
American male writers
American publishers (people)
English emigrants to the United States
Businesspeople from New York City
People from Burslem